Armagh is a small historic village in the western Clare Valley, about 137 km north of Adelaide, South Australia.

History
The village was named after the town and county of Armagh in Ireland. It was founded in 1850 to benefit from the new copper mine, operated by the Royal Mining Company at nearby Emu Flat. The mine was built as part of a mania for copper mining prompted by the large copper finds at Burra and Kapunda but, though some mining efforts continued until 1910, was never successful commercially.

The town today
Today the hills around Armagh are known for the production of wine and olive oil. Most of the old town has vanished leaving only a brick kiln, claypit, a few houses and the Miner’s Home Hotel, now a private museum.

References

External links 
Clare & Gilbert Valleys Council
Clare Valley Tourism

Mining towns in South Australia
Mid North (South Australia)